Boy Problem or variants may refer to:

Boy Problems, band at Raul's (night club)
Boy Problems (Carly Rae Jepsen song)
Boy Problems, defunct screamo band from Philadelphia

See also
"Boy with a problem", song by Elvis Costello Trust (Elvis Costello album) 1981